Robert Taylor is a former professional rugby league footballer who played in the 1950s and 1960s. He played at club level for Castleford (Heritage No. 440).

References

External links
Search for "Taylor" at rugbyleagueproject.org
Robert Taylor Memory Box Search at archive.castigersheritage.com
Bob Taylor Memory Box Search at archive.castigersheritage.com

Living people
Castleford Tigers players
English rugby league players
Place of birth missing (living people)
Year of birth missing (living people)